Thekkummala is a small hill village in Vadaserikara Panchayat in Pathanamthitta district, India.

Location
The nearest town is Vadaserikkara, is about 3 km away. Jeeps and Autos are available from Vadasserikkara as well as Edathar Jn. Both Private and KSRTC Buses are not plying in this route, because of the condition of Road is very bad.

Disambiguation
In Kerala, another village is also called Thekkummala. This village is in Ernakulam district.

Pineapple city
Thekkummala is very near to Vazhakulam, known as Pineapple city. Most of the people are Syrian Catholics. Majority do farming. Major crops are pineapple & rubber.

Access
Buses are not plying in this village. However autos or jeeps are available from nearest town, Vazhakulam.

Landmarks
Thekkummala does not have any institutions or commercial organisations except one school, St.Rita's Lower Primary School.

References 

Villages in Pathanamthitta district